Bing Dwen Dwen is the official mascot of the 2022 Winter Olympics, and Shuey Rhon Rhon is the official mascot of the 2022 Winter Paralympics. The name of Bing Dwen Dwen possibly means ice hulu, as 墩 (Dūn) in its name is a homophone of 礅 (Dūn) in the word 糖礅 in Tianjin dialect, meaning tanghulu, the prototype of the mascot. Both events were held in Beijing, the capital of China.

History 

The mascot design competition was launched on 8 August 2018. A total of 5,816 designs were submitted for further review and ten were shortlisted. The mascots were unveiled on 17 September 2019. Bing Dwen Dwen and Shuey Rhon Rhon were selected over eight other designs.

During the Olympic games, medalists were given a stuffed version of Bing Dwen Dwen at a ceremony immediately after the conclusion of their event, while medals were awarded at a later ceremony combining winners from multiple events.

China has used social media bots and fake accounts to promote the mascot with Chinese media pointing to this inauthentic activity as evidence of the mascot's popularity.

Characteristics 
Bing Dwen Dwen is a giant panda with a suit of ice, a heart of gold and a love of winter sports. "Bing" means ice and embodies purity and strength, the characteristics of the Winter Olympics. "Dwen Dwen", which means health, liveliness and cuteness, conforms to the overall image of pandas and symbolizes the strength, tenacity and inspiring Olympic spirit of Winter Olympic athletes. The colorful ring around Bing Dwen Dwen's face is inspired by the "ice ribbon" of the national speed skating hall of the Beijing Winter Olympics. The heart on Bing Dwen Dwen's palm is a warm welcome to friends all over the world. Bing Dwen Dwen's full-body "shell", which helps the panda to skate, snowboard and ski alongside the Olympic athletes, is a tribute to embracing new technologies for a future with infinite possibilities, the bright colours of the halo around its face are a representation of the latest advanced technologies of the ice and snow sport tracks at the Games, while the heart on its left palm symbolises China's hospitality for athletes and spectators at the Winter Olympics. Some netizens believe Bing Dwen Dwen's design may have also been inspired by the traditional Chinese winter treat tanghulu (糖葫芦) as the suit of ice resembles the clear candy coating. 

Shuey Rhon Rhon is an anthropomorphic Chinese lantern. Lanterns represent harvest, celebration, warmth and light. The wishful shape at the top symbolizes auspicious happiness. The continuous pattern of the dove of peace and the Temple of Heaven symbolize the peaceful friendship and highlights the characteristics of the place where the events are held. The decorative pattern incorporates the traditional Chinese paper-cutting art. The snow on the face represents the meaning of "a fall of seasonable snow gives promise of a fruitful year" (瑞雪兆丰年). It also reflects the anthropomorphic design and highlights the mascot's cuteness.

Bing Dwen Dwen is the main Olympic mascot. Shuey Rhon Rhon is the Paralympic mascot.

Artists 
Bing Dwen Dwen was designed by Cao Xue (曹雪), a chief designer at Guangzhou Academy of Fine Arts. Cao Xue stated that during the months leading up to the games, he and his design team designing and modifying the mascot and once gave up the idea of a panda mascot due to it prevalence. He also expressed his surprise that the demand for the mascot was so high.

Shuey Rhon Rhon was designed by Jiang Yufan (姜玉凡), an undergraduate majoring in product design at the Jilin Art Institute of Design. Jiang Yufan first submitted mascot designs based on a deer, and a combination of a Chinese knot and a dumpling, but after suggestions from her professors she altered the design to be a combination of a Chinese knot and a red lantern.

Media

Merchandising 
Stuffed versions of Bing Dwen Dwen have become a very popular souvenir, with stores regularly selling out and people lining up for hours outside stores, sometimes overnight, to purchase them. Scalpers have also been seen purchasing Bing Dwen Dwen merchandise and reselling it for higher prices.

NFTs 
It was announced on 10 February that 500 epic boxes that would include multiple designs of Bing Dwen Dwen would go on sale the next day via nWayPlay. Each box would be priced at $99, with a maximum of five per purchase and would include three officially licensed digital pins with approved mascot art featuring different winter sports, the official emblem and a poster. Due to their popularity a second round of officially licensed NFTs were announced 17 February, the 200 legendary boxes would be priced at $349, with only one box per purchase. Each legendary box would include a work of art and two pincs.

Reception
Fans of Bing Dwen Dwen expressed outrage over a 8 February interview aired on CCTV where a reporter wore a Bing Dwen Dwen costume to interview athlete Yang Shuorui. Many claimed they would no longer purchase merchandise after the interview as they "don't want to hear the 'uncle' voice of the Bing Dwen Dwen. It's just a little cute panda." The interview video was quickly pulled.

References

External links 
  

2022 Winter Olympics
2022 Winter Paralympics
Olympic mascots
Paralympic mascots
Chinese culture
Mascots introduced in 2019
Fictional pandas
Fictional golems
Science fiction characters
Fictional characters with ice or cold abilities
Fictional characters with weather abilities
Chinese mascots
Bear mascots